Washington's 30th legislative district is one of forty-nine districts in Washington state for representation in the state legislature.

It is mostly in King County with a small section in Pierce County. It covers the cities of Federal Way, Des Moines, Auburn, Algona, Pacific, and Milton, as well as unincorporated parts of King County.

The district's legislators are state senator Claire Wilson and state representatives Jamila Taylor (position 1) and Kristine Reeves (position 2), all Democrats.

See also
Washington Redistricting Commission
Washington State Legislature
Washington State Senate
Washington House of Representatives

References

External links
Washington State Redistricting Commission
Washington House of Representatives
Map of Legislative Districts

30